Dashiell is both a male given name and a surname. Notable people with the name include:

Given name:
Dashiell Eaves (born 1974), American actor
Dashiell Hammett (1894–1961), American author
George Dashiell Bayard (1835–1862), American general
Isaac Dashiell Jones (1806–1893), American politician
Dashiell Mihok (born 1974), American actor

Surname:
Aaron Dashiell (21st century), American football safety
Doug Dashiell (1905–1975), American football coach
John Dashiell (1888-1975), American psychologist
Margaret May Dashiell (1867–1958), American artist and writer 
Paul Dashiell (1867–1937), American football coach
Robert B. Dashiell (1860–1899), American engineer
Russell DaShiell (born 1947), American guitarist 
Wally Dashiell (1902–1972), American baseball shortstop
William Robert Dashiell (1863–1939), American military officer

Fictional characters
 Dashiell Gibson, main character of the book series Moon Base Alpha by Stuart Gibbs
Dashiell Robert Parr, character from The Incredibles
 Dashiell "Dash" Arkadin, one of the three “Precogs” from Minority Report (film)
 Dashiell Qwerty, character in Who Could That Be at This Hour? by Lemony Snikett